Helen Georgena Roberts Berrigan (born April 15, 1948), known professionally as Helen Ginger Berrigan and Ginger Berrigan, is an inactive Senior United States district judge of the United States District Court for the Eastern District of Louisiana.

Helen Ginger Berrigan serves as a District Court Judge in the Eastern District of Louisiana in the United States. Helen became appointed to this position by the then president, Bill Clinton, in 1994. Between 2001 and 2008, Helen dutifully served as the Chief Judge of the Eastern District. Before this appointment, she had been serving as a criminal defense attorney. During her career, she has also served as a freelance reporter to various publications based in different regions. She has authored the Louisiana Criminal Trial Practice. Apart from her career as a lawyer and journalist, Berrigan has also led in various associations like the New Orleans Association for Women Attorneys.

Early life and education
Born in New Rochelle, New York, Berrigan received a Bachelor of Arts degree from the University of Wisconsin-Madison in 1969, a Master of Arts from American University in 1971, and a Juris Doctor from Louisiana State University Law School in 1977. In China, Turkey, Malawi, Azerbaijan, Pakistan, and Bangladesh, she has finished "rule of law" trainings that allow her to practice law within these countries.

Career
Following her graduation from Louisiana State University Law School, Berrigan was a Staff attorney of Governor's Pardon, Parole and Rehabilitation Commission from 1977 to 1978. She was in private practice as a criminal defense attorney in New Orleans, Louisiana from 1978 to 1994. She was also a freelance journalist for local publications, as well as a Legislative Aide to Senator Joe Biden. Aside from her work as a Senior Judge, she is a frequent speaker in locally sponsored Continuing Legal Education programs, and she currently serves as an adjunct professor at LSU and Loyola Schools of Law.

In addition to her private practice and journalism, Berrigan has held positions at several legal organizations. Some legal organizations she has worked for include The Louisiana Association for Criminal Defense Lawyers which focuses on improving cooperation between lawyers through educational programs that promote the common good and societal well-being. Another focus of the organization is to assist the courts, and law enforcement agencies by establishing their legitimacy through just law and the protection of individual rights guaranteed by the Louisiana and United States Constitutions. Another legal organization Berrigan worked for was The American Civil Liberties Union which was founded in the 1920s and has fought to ensure the promise of the Bill of Rights and to expand its reach to people historically denied protection from the government.

Federal judicial service
On November 18, 1993, Berrigan was nominated by President Bill Clinton to a seat on the United States District Court for the Eastern District of Louisiana vacated by Patrick Eugene Carr. She was confirmed by the United States Senate on March 10, 1994, and received her commission the same day. She served as Chief Judge from 2001 to 2008 and took senior status, a form of semi-retirement, on August 23, 2016, under President Obama. During her time as an active judge for the Eastern District of Louisiana, she was largely considered among the most liberal of those serving New Orleans.

Notable cases 
In February 2014, Berrigan served as the judge in the USA v. Nagin criminal trial concerning fraud of former New Orleans mayor Ray Nagin during Hurricane Katrina, in which Nagin was found to have participated among six others in a conspiracy and 59 related acts spanning his entire time as mayor. Nagin's requests for supplemental time prior to the trial in October 2013 were denied, and it continued as a Speedy Trial. The case was based on allegations that Nagin had accepted over $500,000 in gifts in exchange for official favors, as well as committed tax and wire fraud contrary to his promises when assuming office that he would reform the corrupt New Orleans City Hall. He was found guilty on 20 of 21 charges, and acquitted on one. Berrigan sentenced him to 10 years in prison, a sentence some believe was too low, in July 2014. This case is considered noteworthy because it is the first trial in which a New Orleans mayor was tried and convicted on corruption charges.

References

External links
  

1948 births
Living people
University of Wisconsin–Madison alumni
Louisiana State University Law Center alumni
American University alumni
Lawyers from New Rochelle, New York
Judges of the United States District Court for the Eastern District of Louisiana
United States district court judges appointed by Bill Clinton
20th-century American judges
21st-century American judges
20th-century American women judges
21st-century American women judges